Helston South was an electoral division of Cornwall in the United Kingdom which returned one member to sit on Cornwall Council between 2013 and 2021. It was abolished at the 2021 local elections, being succeeded by Helston North and Helston South and Meneage.

Councillors

Extent
Helston South represented the centre of the town of Helston as well as parts of Culdrose. The division covered 360 hectares in total.

Election results

2017 election

2013 election

References

Electoral divisions of Cornwall Council
Helston